Diego Sebastian Crosa (born 18 April 1976 in Rosario) is an Argentinian footballer.  He was signed for Chacarita Juniors for the 2009 Apertura tournament where he played with his younger brother, Fernando Crosa, and in 2010 he signed for San Luis Quillota.

Crosa was part of the Argentina Under-20 squad that won the 1995 FIFA World Youth Championship in Qatar.

External links

 ESPNdeportes.com profile (Spanish)
 Maccabi Haifa page
 Argentine Primera statistics
 Clarín article

1976 births
Living people
Argentine footballers
Argentina youth international footballers
Argentina under-20 international footballers
Argentina international footballers
Newell's Old Boys footballers
Club Atlético Vélez Sarsfield footballers
Boca Juniors footballers
Real Betis players
Racing Club de Avellaneda footballers
Maccabi Haifa F.C. players
Club Atlético Colón footballers
Chacarita Juniors footballers
San Luis de Quillota footballers
Argentine Primera División players
La Liga players
Argentine expatriate footballers
Argentine expatriate sportspeople in Spain
Expatriate footballers in Chile
Expatriate footballers in Spain
Expatriate footballers in Israel
Israeli Premier League players
Association football defenders
Footballers from Rosario, Santa Fe